Mickaël Damian (born 9 November 1969) is a French middle-distance runner. He competed in the men's 1500 metres at the 1996 Summer Olympics.

References

1969 births
Living people
Athletes (track and field) at the 1996 Summer Olympics
French male middle-distance runners
Olympic athletes of France
Place of birth missing (living people)